The 1998 LSU Tigers football team represented Louisiana State University in the 1998 NCAA Division I-A football season. They were coached by Gerry DiNardo. The Tigers played their home games at Tiger Stadium in Baton Rouge, Louisiana.  In the beginning of the season, expectations were high as LSU had tied for the SEC West title but lost tiebreakers the previous two seasons. After a 3–0 start and No. 6 national ranking, the Tigers' season stunningly fell apart. They finished 1–7 in the last eight games of the season with many close losses, and finished with a record of 4–7.

Schedule

Rankings

References

LSU
LSU Tigers football seasons
LSU Tigers football